Jesse is a given name, mostly masculine, of English and Dutch origin. The given name was originally derived from the Hebrew name Yishai, which means "God exists".

The English name was translated into many languages (especially Romance languages and Greek). It has been a popular given name in many English-speaking countries since the 1880s. Despite being similar in appearance, it is unrelated in origin to the given name Jessica.

Cognates 

Arabic: Yassa
Catalan: Jessè
Czech: Isaj, Jišaj
Dutch: Isaï, Jesse
English: Jess (diminutive), Jessie (alternative spelling), Jesse, Jessy (alternative spelling)
French: Isaï, Jessé
German: Isai, Jischaj
Greek: Iessai
Hebrew: Yishai, Yishay
Italian: Iesse
Latin: Isai
Portuguese: Jessé
Romanian: Isseu
Russian: Iessej (Cyrillic: Иессей)
Spanish: Isai, Isaí, Ishai, Jessé

Actors
Jesse Bradford, American actor
Jesse Borrego, American actor
Jesse Draper, American actress
Jesse Eisenberg, American actor
Jesse Jane, American pornographic actress
Jesse Heiman, American actor
Jesse Metcalfe, American actor
Jesse Randhawa, Indian actress
Jesse Lee Soffer, American actor
Jesse Spencer, Australian actor
Jesse Williams (actor), American actor
Jesse Tyler Ferguson, American actor

Athletes
 Jesse, ring name of professional wrestler Ray Gordy
 Jesse, birth name of sumo rikishi Takamiyama Daigorō
Jesse Anderson (American football), American professional football player
Jesse Barfield, professional baseball player
Jesse Barnes, American professional baseball player
Jesse Burkett, American professional baseball player, college coach
Jesse Carlson, American professional baseball player
Jesse Carver, British football player and manager
Jesse Chavez, American baseball player
Jesse Crain, Canadian professional baseball player
Jesse English, professional baseball player for the Washington Nationals
Jesse Foppert, professional baseball player
Jesse Iwuji (born 1987), American racing driver
Jesse Levine (born 1987), American-Canadian professional tennis player
Jesse Lingard, English professional football player
Jesse Luketa (born 1999), Canadian-born American football player
Jesse Lumsden, professional football player, former McMaster University running back
Jesse Makarounas, Australian footballer
Jesse McDonald (archer) (born 1988), Australian archer
Jesse Orosco, professional baseball player
Jesse Owens, American Olympic athlete
Jesse Palmer, professional football player, former Bachelor star
Jesse Puljujärvi, professional hockey player
Jesse Ryder,  New Zealand cricketer
Jesse Sorensen, American professional wrestler
Jesse Winker, American baseball player

Criminals
Jesse Anderson, American murderer
Jesse James, American Wild West outlaw
Jesse James Hollywood, American kidnapper and murderer 
Jesse Pomeroy, American killer
Jesse Rugge, American kidnapper, involved in murder

Musicians
Jesse Anderson (musician) (1940–2014), American blues singer-songwriter and musician
Jesse Carmichael, keyboard player for the band Maroon 5
Jesse Cook, Canadian guitarist
Jesse Davis (disambiguation), multiple people
Jesse Fuller, American one-man-band
Jesse Harris, American singer-songwriter
Jesse Huerta, one half of duo Jesse & Joy
Jesse Hughes, American frontman of the band Eagles of Death Metal
Jesse Hughes, Canadian DJ and producer, known by stagename Vanic
Jesse F. Keeler, musician, member of the band Death From Above 1979
Jesse Lacey, American frontman for the band Brand New
Jess Margera, American musician, member of the band CKY
Jesse McCartney, American singer
Jesse Michaels, Former frontman for Operation Ivy and Common Rider
Jesse Pintado, American guitarist, ex-member of Napalm Death and Terrorizer
Jesse Powell, American R&B singer
Jesse Quin, bassist for British band Keane
Jesse James Rutherford, American singer/songwriter, member of The Neighbourhood
Jesse Winchester (1944–2014), American singer-songwriter
Jesse Wood, English singer son of Ronnie Wood
Jesse Colin Young, American singer/songwriter, member of The Youngbloods

Politicians
Jesse Matlack Baker, Pennsylvania State Senator and State Representative
Jesse G. Bowles (1921–2007), Justice of the Supreme Court of Georgia
Jesse D. Bright, U.S. senator from Indiana
Jesse Atherton Bynum, Democratic U.S. representative from North Carolina
Jesse Collings, English reformer, member of Parliament, mayor of Birmingham
Jesse Franklin, Democratic-Republic senator and governor of North Carolina
Jesse Gray, New York civil rights leader and politician
Jesse Helms, Republican U.S. senator from North Carolina (1973-2003)
Jesse Jackson, American civil rights activist, politician, and minister
Jesse Klaver, Dutch politician
Jesse Norman, British Conservative MP for Hereford and South Herefordshire
Jesse Robredo, Former Mayor of Naga City in the Philippines 
Jesse B. Thomas, Democratic-Republican senator from Illinois
Jesse M. Unruh, Democratic politician, state treasurer of California (1975–1987)
Jesse Ventura, pro wrestler and governor of Minnesota 
Jesse Johnson Yeates, Democratic U.S. representative from North Carolina
Jesse A. Younger, Republican U.S. representative from California

Scientists
Jesse L. Greenstein, American astronomer
Jesse William Lazear, American physician
Jesse Ramsden, English inventor
Jesse Lowen Shearer, American engineer
Jesse Ehrenfeld, American physician
Jesse K. Marden, American physician

Others 
Jesse, father of David
Jesse Alto, American poker player
Jesse Applegate, American pioneer
Jesse L. Brown, American aviator, first African-American naval aviator 
Jesse Camp, former MTV personality
Jesse Chabot, Canadian screenwriter
Jesse Cox (broadcaster) (1986–2017), Australian radio producer, broadcaster and documentary maker
Jesse Cox (YouTuber), American YouTube gaming personality
Jesse Dirkhising (1986–1999), American murder victim
Jesse Duke, American former slave, activist, newspaper editor
Jesse Dylan, American film and video director, son of Bob Dylan
Jesse Honey, English quiz player and winner of BBC Mastermind 2010
Jesse Horn, American writer and illustrator
Jesse Hughes, American frontiersman
Jesse James (television personality), American custom motorcycle builder and TV personality
Jesse Fuller McDonald (1858–1942), American public official, civil engineer and surveyor
Jesse Clyde Nichols, American real estate developer
Jesse B. Oldendorf, American Navy admiral
Jesse Shwayder (1882–1970), American businessman, founder of the Samsonite Corporation
Jesse Walker, American journalist and historian
Jesse Wellens, American YouTuber

Fictional characters
 Jesse, the protagonist of Minecraft: Story Mode
 Jesse, the only boy of The Teens and one of the recurring characters from an American-Canadian animated series Peg + Cat
 Jesse, one of the troopers of the 501st Legion from Star Wars: The Clone Wars (2008 TV series)
 Jesse, from an adult animated sitcom, Solar Opposites
 Jesse, in a Canadian animated series, Looped (TV series)
Jesse Aarons, in the book Bridge to Terabithia
Jesse Anderson, from a Japanese anime series, Yu-Gi-Oh! GX
Jesse Chambers, a DC comic book superhero
 Jesse Cosay, one of the main characters from Infinity Train
Jesse Custer, in the comic book series Preacher
 Jesse Doe, a fictional 80 year old man who was said to have been found dead under an overpass in San Diego, California and was said to have been identified as being Elvis Presley
Jesse Duke (Dukes of Hazzard), from the TV show and movie The Dukes of Hazzard
Jesse Glenn, Gundalian Ventus Brawler from the animated series Bakugan: Gundalian Invaders
 Jesse Fitzgerald, from an 2009 American film My Sister's Keeper (film)
 Jesse Hall, one of the characters from The Mighty Ducks (1992 film) and D2: The Mighty Ducks
Jesse Katsopolis, in the TV sitcom Full House
Jesse McCree, from the video game Overwatch (video game)
Jesse McNally, in the T.V. Show Buffy the Vampire Slayer
Jesse Pinkman, in the TV series Breaking Bad
Jesse Porter, a burned spy who works with Michael on USA's Burn Notice
Jesse Ramirez, from the TV show Roswell
Jesse St. James, from the American TV series Glee
Jesse Stefanovic, in the Canadian TV series Degrassi: The Next Generation
 Jesse Stone, from the detective movies based on the Jesse Stone novels by Robert B. Parker
 Jesse Wallace, the protagonist from the Before trilogy.
 Jesse Warner, the title character from a 1998-2000 sitcom Jesse (TV series).

See  also
Jessye, given name and surname
Jesse (disambiguation)

References

English masculine given names
Hebrew masculine given names
Dutch masculine given names
Modern names of Hebrew origin